AUSD may refer to:
Alameda Unified School District
Albany Unified School District, in Albany, California
 Alhambra Unified School District
Arcadia Unified School District
Azusa Unified School District
Australian dollar